Azelaic acid (AzA) is a organic compound with the formula HOOC(CH2)7COOH. This saturated dicarboxylic acid exists as a white powder. It is found in wheat, rye, and barley. It is a precursor to diverse industrial products including polymers and plasticizers, as well as being a component of a number of hair and skin conditioners. AzA inhibits tyrosinase.

Production
Azelaic acid is industrially produced by the ozonolysis of oleic acid. The side product is nonanoic acid. It is produced naturally by Malassezia furfur (also known as Pityrosporum ovale), a yeast that lives on normal skin. The bacterial degradation of nonanoic acid gives azelaic acid.

Biological function
In plants, azelaic acid serves as a "distress flare" involved in defense responses after infection. It serves as a signal that induces the accumulation of salicylic acid, an important component of a plant's defensive response.

Applications

Polymers and related materials
Esters of this dicarboxylic acid find applications in lubrication and plasticizers. In lubricant industries it is used as a thickening agent in lithium complex grease. With hexamethylenediamine, azelaic acid forms Nylon-6,9, which finds specialized uses as a plastic.

Medical
Azelaic acid is used to treat mild to moderate acne, both comedonal acne and inflammatory acne. It belongs to a class of medication called dicarboxylic acids. It works by killing acne bacteria that infect skin pores. It also decreases the production of keratin, which is a natural substance that promotes the growth of acne bacteria. Azelaic acid is also used as a topical gel treatment for rosacea, due to its ability to reduce inflammation. It clears the bumps and swelling caused by rosacea. The mechanism of action is thought to be through the inhibition of hyperactive protease activity that converts cathelicidin into the antimicrobial skin peptide LL-37.

In topical pharmaceutical preparations and scientific research AzA is typically used in concentrations between 15% and 20% but some research demonstrates that in certain vehicle formulations the pharmaceutical effects of 10% Azelaic acid has the potential to be fully comparable to that of some 20% creams.

Acne treatment 
Azelaic acid is effective for mild to moderate acne when applied topically at a 15%-20% concentration. In patients with moderate acne, twice daily application over 3 months of 20% AzA significantly reduced the number of comedones, papules, and pustules; at this strength, it’s considered to be as effective as benzoyl peroxide 5%, tretinoin 0.05%, erythromycin 2%, and oral tetracycline at 500mg-1000mg. In a comparative review of effects of topical AzA, Salicylic acid, Nicotinamide, Sulfur, Zinc, and alpha-hydroxy acid, AzA had more high-quality evidence of effectiveness than the rest. Results can be expected after 4 weeks of twice-daily treatment. The effectiveness of long term use is unclear, but it’s been recommended that AzA be used for at least 6 months continuously for maintenance.

Whitening agent 
Azelaic acid is used for treatment of skin pigmentation, including melasma and postinflammatory hyperpigmentation, particularly in those with darker skin types. It has been recommended as an alternative to hydroquinone. As a tyrosinase inhibitor,  azelaic acid reduces synthesis of melanin. According to one report in 1988, azelaic acid in combination with zinc sulfate in vitro was found to be a potent (90% inhibition) 5α-reductase inhibitor, similar to the hair loss drugs finasteride and dutasteride.  In vitro research during mid-1980s evaluating azelaic acid's depigmenting (whitening) capability concluded it is effective (cytotoxic to melanocytes) at only high concentrations.

A 1996 review claimed 20% AzA is as potent as 4% hydroquinone after a period of application of three months without the latter's adverse effects and even more effective if applied along with tretinoin for the same period of time.

Brand names

Brand names for azelaic acid include Dermaz 99, Crema Pella Perfetta (micronized azelaic acid, kojic dipalmitate, and liquorice extract), Azepur99, Azetec99, Azaclear (azelaic acid and niacinamide), AzClear Action, Azelex, White Action cream, Finacea, Finevin, Melazepam, Skinoren, Ezanic, Azelac, Azaderm, (Acnegen, Eziderm, Acnicam, Azelexin in Pakistan)

References

External links
 
 

5α-Reductase inhibitors
Dicarboxylic acids
Anti-acne preparations